KwaGuqa is a township west of the industrial town of eMalahleni in the South African province of Mpumalanga.

References

Populated places in the Steve Tshwete Local Municipality